USS Edison may refer to the following ships of the United States Navy:

 , a United States Navy destroyer
 , a U.S. Navy ballistic-missile submarine

See also
 , a U.S. Navy destroyer

United States Navy ship names